, is a micro-asteroid, classified as near-Earth object of the Apollo group and Aten group, respectively. It is currently trapped in a 1:1 mean motion resonance with the Earth of the horseshoe type. The object was first observed on 27 February 2017, by astronomers of the Catalina Sky Survey conducted at Mount Lemmon Observatory, Arizona, United States.

Discovery 

 was first observed by astronomer D. C. Fuls on 27 February 2017, using the 0.68-meter Schmidt camera of the Catalina Sky Survey at a visual apparent magnitude of 19.6.

Orbit and physical properties 

The asteroid's orbit has still a high uncertainty; with a very short observation arc of just 5 days. It orbits the Sun at a distance of 0.76–1.24 AU once every 366 days (semi-major axis of 1.00 AU). Its orbit has an eccentricity of 0.24 and an inclination of 3° with respect to the ecliptic. With a semi-major axis of that of Earth, the object is both classified as a member of Apollo and Aten in the JPL Small-Body Database and by the Minor Planet Center, respectively. Both Apollo and Aten asteroids are Earth-crossing asteroids.

Earth co-orbital 

 is currently trapped in a 1:1 mean motion resonance with the Earth of the horseshoe type and follows an orbit similar to those of 54509 YORP,  and several other near-Earth asteroids.

Physical characteristics 

 has an absolute magnitude of 27.6 which gives a calculated mean diameter between 9 and 20 meters for an assumed geometric albedo of 0.20 and 0.04, respectively, which are typical values for stony S-type and carbonaceous C-type asteroids.

Notes 

  This is assuming an albedo of 0.20 and 0.04, respectively.

References

External links 
 MPEC 2017-E31 : 2017 DR109, Minor Planet Electronic Circular
 List Of Apollo Minor Planets (by designation)
  at AstDys-2, Asteroids Dynamic Site
 
 
 

Minor planet object articles (unnumbered)
Earth-crossing asteroids

20170227